Conversations is From a Second Story Window's second and final full-length studio album. It was released on May 27, 2008. This album is a concept album, telling the stories of people of the world and the conversations they have with each other.

Track listing

Personnel 
 Will Jackson – Vocals
 Rob Hileman – Rhythm guitar
 Paul Misko – Lead guitar
 Joe Sudrovic – Bass
 Nick Huffman – Drums

References

External links
Metalunderground News
FASSW's Official Website
FASSW's Myspace

2008 albums
From a Second Story Window albums
Black Market Activities albums
Metal Blade Records albums
Concept albums